David Frederick Malin   (born 28 March 1941) is a British-Australian astronomer and photographer.  He is principally known for his spectacular colour images of astronomical objects.  A galaxy is named after him, Malin 1, which he discovered in 1986 and which is the largest spiral galaxy so far discovered.

Career
Malin was born in 1941 and raised in Heywood, Greater Manchester, in the north of England. He was trained as a chemist and originally worked as a microscopist. In 1975 he moved to Sydney to take up a job with the Anglo-Australian Observatory (AAO), now the Australian Astronomical Observatory.

Whilst working at the AAO, Malin developed several photographic processing techniques to maximise the ability to extract faint and low contrast detail from the non-linear response and high densities of photographic plates.

These techniques were initially devised to enhance the scientific return from photography, but Malin is now best known for the series of three-colour wide field images of deep space objects which have been widely published as posters and in books around the world. Most professional astronomical photographs are monochromatic; if colour pictures are required, three images are needed. During his career at the AAO, Malin made about 150 three-colour images of deep sky objects, mostly using plates taken with the  Anglo-Australian Telescope and the  UK Schmidt Telescope.

The true-colour images are assembled from three separate monochromatic photographs taken through red, green and blue filters. Each photographic plate is a special black and white emulsion designed for low light conditions and is further enhanced for low light sensitivity by baking in a nitrogen and hydrogen atmosphere. The exposure times are relatively long, varying between 5–60 minutes for each colour, depending on the luminosity of the object. The colour image is re-assembled in the darkroom, where further techniques such as unsharp masking to enhance fine detail might also be applied.

Since the early 1990s, silver-based astrophotography has been largely superseded by digital sensors, but many of the technical advances Malin introduced to the field have been carried over to processing astrophotography on computers.

Malin has published over 250 academic papers on the Astrophysics Data System (ADS) and ten books.

In 2001 he retired from the AAO to concentrate on his own business, David Malin Images, which manages his image collection along with those of related photographers.

Awards
 1985: Henri Chrétien Award of the American Astronomical Society
 1986: Jackson-Gwilt Medal, Royal Astronomical Society
 1990: Rodman Medal of the Royal Photographic Society
 1993: Progress Medal, highest award of the Photographic Society of America
 1993: Commonwealth Medal of the Australian Photographic Society
 1994: University of NSW Press/Eureka Science Book Prize (for "A View of the Universe")
 1998: Elected Fellow of the International Academy of Astronautics
 2000: Lennart Nilsson Award for outstanding imaging in science
 2003: Honorary Doctorate of Applied Science from RMIT University
 2006: Hubble Award of the Advanced Imaging Conference
 2019: Member of the Order of Australia

Minor planet 4766 Malin discovered by Eleanor Helin is named after him.

Selected publications

References

External links
 Astronomical Images at the Anglo-Australian Observatory
 David Malin Images
 "Photographer to the Stars", interview of Malin at Seed magazine, 28 July 2008
 David Malin biography and gallery at The World at Night
 "Steve and the stars", an Australian Astronomical Observatory video portraying David Malin among others

1941 births
Living people
20th-century Australian astronomers
20th-century British astronomers
20th-century Australian inventors
Members of the Order of Australia
English emigrants to Australia